Chanthaburi Province Stadium or Chanthaburi PAO. Stadium is a multi-purpose stadium in Chanthaburi Province, Thailand. It is currently used mostly for football matches and is the home stadium of Chanthaburi F.C. The stadium holds 5,000 people.

Multi-purpose stadiums in Thailand